State Route 33 (SR 33) is a  state highway in the northwestern part of the U.S. state of Alabama. The southern terminus of the highway is at its intersection with U.S. Route 278 (US 278) at Double Springs. The northern terminus of the highway is at its intersection with US 72 Alt. and SR 20 at Courtland.

Route description

In Double Springs, SR 33 junctions with SR 195 and US 278. SR 195 continues south to Jasper on SR 33's right-of-way. SR 195 continues northwest to Haleyville at a point just west of this junction along US 278.

The route continues through the William B. Bankhead National Forest to Grayson, where it junctions with Winston County Road 63, a short-route to Houston.

The route crosses the Lawrence County line and junctions with Cranal Road, which leads to SR 195 and Haleyville. It makes multiple curves as it journeys through the forest. It makes a curve from north to the southeast and then north again as it leaves the National Forest. This curve is easily recognizable on road maps. The route descends down a hill and enters Wren, finally leaving the National Forest. It junctions with SR 36 and enters Moulton soon after. The route junctions with County Road 460, which is the old SR 24 right-of-way. The route continues north to SR 24's new alignment—a four-lane divided highway—and passes by an electrical zone. It junctions with SR 157 and leaves Moulton. The route passes through slightly curvy terrain for the next few miles, entering Courtland eventually. The route reaches its northern terminus at SR 20/US 72 Alt.

History

The current incarnation of SR 33 was formed in 1957, when the route designations for SR 33 and SR 36 were swapped.

Major intersections

See also

References

 

033
Transportation in Winston County, Alabama
Transportation in Lawrence County, Alabama